Ariel Behar and Gonzalo Escobar were the defending champions but chose not to defend their title.

André Göransson and David Pel won the title after defeating Lloyd Glasspool and Harri Heliövaara 4–6, 6–3, [10–8] in the final.

Seeds

Draw

References

External links
 Main draw

Amex-Istanbul Challenger - Doubles
2021 Doubles